Lead hydrogen arsenate, also called lead arsenate, acid lead arsenate or LA, chemical formula PbHAsO4, is an inorganic insecticide used primarily against the potato beetle.
Lead arsenate was the most extensively used arsenical insecticide. Two principal formulations of lead arsenate were marketed: basic lead arsenate (Pb5OH(AsO4)3, CASN: 1327-31-7) and acid lead arsenate (PbHAsO4).

Production and structure
It is usually produced using the following reaction, which leads to formation of the desired product as a solid precipitate:
Pb(NO3)2 +  H3AsO4 → PbHAsO4 +2 HNO3
It has the same structure as the hydrogen phosphate PbHPO4.  Like lead sulfate PbSO4, these salts are poorly soluble.

Uses
As an insecticide, it was introduced in 1898 used against the gypsy moth in Massachusetts. It represented a less soluble and less toxic alternative to then-used Paris Green, which is about 10x more toxic. It also adhered better to the surface of the plants, further enhancing and prolonging its insecticidal effect.

Lead arsenate was widely used in Australia, Canada, New Zealand, US, England, France, North Africa, and many other areas, principally against the codling moth and snow-white linden moth. It was used mainly on apples, but also on other fruit trees, garden crops, turfgrasses, and against mosquitoes. In combination with ammonium sulfate, it was used in southern California as a winter treatment on lawns to kill crab grass seed.

The search for a substitute was commenced in 1919, when it was found that its residues remain in the products despite washing their surfaces. Alternatives were found to be less effective or more toxic to plants and animals, until 1947 when DDT was found.  US EPA banned use of lead arsenate on food crops in 1988.

Safety
LD50 is 1050 mg/kg (rat, oral).

Morel mushrooms growing in old apple orchards that had been treated with lead arsenate may accumulate levels of toxic lead and arsenic that are unhealthy for human consumption.

Lead arsenate was used as an insecticide in deciduous fruit trees from 1892 until around 1947 in Washington. Peryea et al. studied the distribution of Pb and As in these soils, concluding that these levels were above maximum tolerance levels. This indicates that these levels could be of environmental concern and potentially could be contaminating the groundwater in the area.

Human exposure to lead arsenate, particularly in cases of excessive or careless application of the pesticide, caused nervous system illnesses to include acute flaccid paralysis and degeneration of the anterior horns of the spinal cord resulting in symptoms similar to poliomyelitis.

See also
 Calcium arsenate

References

External links
 Case Studies in Environmental Medicine - Arsenic Toxicity
 Case Studies in Environmental Medicine - Lead Toxicity
 National Pollutant Inventory - Lead and Lead Compounds Fact Sheet
 Lead arsenate history

Lead(II) compounds
Hydrogen compounds
Arsenates
Inorganic insecticides